CV Villas is a London-based travel agency for villas in Greece, Italy, France, Spain, Portugal, Croatia, Turkey, Morocco, Florida, Sri Lanka and the Caribbean. Today, it is a specialist tour operator, selling villa holidays including flights, car hire and experiences directly to clients and through independent travel agents. The company has over 800 lodgings in the world.

History 
The agency was founded in 1972 by Patricia and Richard Cookson. In the early days, individually produced, hand-finished brochures were sent out with a note asking for them to be returned. During its first decade, the company added to its collection of Corfiot houses. In the 1980s, the company expanded its portfolio to offer villas on other Greek islands as well as in Italy, France, Spain, Portugal and the Balearics.

By the 1990s, Morocco was added as a new destination. The Cooksons sold their interest in the company in 2004 to travel entrepreneur John Boyle and in 2007. CV Travel was acquired by specialist tour operator Kuoni Travel. Debbie Marshall was appointed managing director in 2004 and, under her management, CV Travel acquired the ski chalet operator, Ski Verbier, in 2005. Richard Cookson continued to work for CV in Corfu for a number of years.
In 2007, the company added the Caribbean as a destination, and in 2009, included properties in Great Britain.

In September 2015 DER Touristik Group acquired Kuoni Travel's tour-operator and sales activities including CV Villas.

In 2016 Croatia was added to the portfolio and in 2017 they launched Resort properties. In 2019 the company's new luxury collection ABOVE emerged, containing a selection of fully staffed properties.

Sri Lanka is the most recent destination to be added to their long haul portfolio, launched for travel in 2021.

Awards 
CV Travel won Condé Nast Traveler awards in 2007 and 2009  and was a runner-up in 2008, 2016, 2017, 2018, 2019 and 2020.

Protection 
CV Villas are a member of ABTA, which stands for the Association of British Travel Agents. ABTA protection is designed to enforce standards and provide insurance for holidaymakers in the event of financial problems for travel companies. They are also fully bonded with CAA, the UK Civil Aviation Authority and have an ATOL (Air Travel Organisers Licence), meaning that package holidays are protected, ensuring peace of mind for guests.

Kuoni UK 
CV Villas is part of The Kuoni UK group. Kuoni is part of DER Touristik (part of the German REWE Group) and is based in Dorking, Surrey, England. The Kuoni UK group also includes:

 Voyages Jules Verne (now trading as Jules Verne)
 Kirker Holidays
 Carrier
 Journey Latin America
 Kuoni Retail

References

External links
 

Transport companies established in 1972
Travel and holiday companies of the United Kingdom
Travel agencies
1972 establishments in England